Northeast Aitkin is an unorganized territory in Aitkin County, Minnesota, United States. The population was 11 at the 2010 census.

Geography

Demographics
At the 2000 census there were 14 people, 6 households, and 4 families in the unorganized territory. The population density was 0.2 people per square mile (0.1/km2). There were 11 housing units at an average density of 0.1/sq mi (0.1/km2).  The racial makeup of the unorganized territory was 100.00% White.
Of the 6 households 16.7% had children under the age of 18 living with them, 66.7% were married couples living together, and 33.3% were non-families. 33.3% of households were one person and 16.7% were one person aged 65 or older. The average household size was 2.33 and the average family size was 3.00.

The age distribution was 21.4% under the age of 18, 7.1% from 18 to 24, 42.9% from 25 to 44, 21.4% from 45 to 64, and 7.1% 65 or older. The median age was 37 years. For every 100 females, there were 100.0 males. For every 100 females age 18 and over, there were 83.3 males.

The median household income was $23,750 and the median family income  was $37,500. Males had a median income of $46,250 versus $0 for females. The per capita income for the unorganized territory was $16,210. None of the population or the families were below the poverty line.

References

Populated places in Aitkin County, Minnesota
Unorganized territories in Minnesota